Mario Davidovsky (March 4, 1934 – August 23, 2019) was an Argentine-American composer. Born in Argentina, he emigrated in 1960 to the United States, where he lived for the remainder of his life. He is best known for his series of compositions called Synchronisms, which in live performance incorporate both acoustic instruments and electroacoustic sounds played from a tape.

Biography
Davidovsky was born in Médanos, Buenos Aires Province, Argentina, a town nearly 600 km southwest of the city of Buenos Aires and close to the seaport of Bahía Blanca. Aged seven, he began his musical studies on the violin. At thirteen he began composing. He studied composition and theory under  at the University of Buenos Aires, from which he graduated.

In 1958, he studied with Aaron Copland and Milton Babbitt at the Berkshire Music Center (now the Tanglewood Music Center) in Lenox, Massachusetts. Through Babbitt, who worked at the Columbia-Princeton Electronic Music Center, and others, Davidovsky developed an interest in electroacoustic music. Copland encouraged Davidovsky to emigrate to the United States, and in 1960, Davidovsky settled in New York City, where he was appointed associate director of the Columbia-Princeton Electronic Music Center. It was at that time he began to compose electo-acoustic works called Synchronisms.

Most of his published compositions since the 1970s have been nonelectronic. His only published electroacoustic compositions since that time are Synchronisms No. 9 (1988) and Synchronisms No. 10 (1992). However, Davidovsky received a commission by a group led by the Society for Electro-Acoustic Music in the United States (SEAMUS) to compose two more electroacoustic works in the Synchronisms series. No. 11 and No. 12 premiered in 2007 at the SEAMUS National Conference in Ames, Iowa.

Davidovsky's association with the Columbia-Princeton Electronic Music Center continued, and from 1981 to 1993 he was the lab's director as well as professor of music at Columbia. In 1994 he became professor of music at Harvard. During his career, Davidovsky has also taught at many other institutions: University of Michigan (1964), the Di Tella Institute of Buenos Aires (1965), the Manhattan School of Music (1968–69), Yale University (1969–70), and the City College of New York (1968–80).

He served on the composition faculty of Mannes College The New School for Music.

In 1982, Davidovsky was elected a member of the American Academy of Arts and Letters.

Personal life 
Davidovsky married Elaine Blaustein in 1962; she died in 2017. They had two children, and three grandchildren. He died in New York City on August 23, 2019 at the age of 85.

Awards
The American Academy of Arts and Letters' Academy Award (1965)
Pulitzer Prize (1971)
Brandeis University Creative Arts Award
Aaron Copland-Tanglewood Award
SEAMUS Lifetime Achievement Award (1989)
Naumburg Award
Peggy Guggenheim Award (1982)
Barlow Endowment for Music Composition – Commission (2003)

Fellowships
Koussevitzky fellowship (1958)
Rockefeller fellowships (1963,1964)
Guggenheim fellowships (1960,1971)
Williams Foundation Fellowship
Walter Channing Cabot Fellowship

Works

String Quartet No. 1 (1951)
Concertino for Percussion and String Orchestra (1954)
Quintet for Clarinet and Strings (1955)
Suite Sinfonica Para "El Payaso" (1955), orchestra
Three Pieces for Woodwind Quartet (1956)
Noneti for Nine Instruments (1956)
String Quartet No. 2 (1958)
Serie Sinfonica 1959 (1959), orchestra
Contrastes No. 1 (1960), string orchestra and electronic sounds
Electronic Study No. 1 (1961) Columbia-Princeton Electronic Music Center
Piano 1961 (1961), orchestra
Electronic Study No. 2 (1962)
Synchronisms No. 1 (1962), flute and electronic sound
Trio for Clarinet, Trumpet, and Viola (1962)
Synchronisms No. 2 (1964), flute, clarinet, violin, cello and tape
Synchronisms No. 3 (1964), cello and electronic sound
Electronic Study No. 3 (1965)
Inflexions (1965), chamber ensemble
Junctures (1966), flute, clarinet, and violin
Synchronisms No. 4 (1966), chorus and tape
Music for Solo Violin (1968)
Synchronisms No. 5 (1969), percussion players and tape
Synchronisms No. 6 (1970), piano and electronic sound (won 1971 Pulitzer Prize)
Chacona (1971), violin, cello, and piano
Transientes (1972), orchestra
Ludus 2 (1973), flute, clarinet, violin, cello, piano
Synchronisms No. 7 (1974), orchestra and tape
Synchronisms No. 8 (1974), woodwind quintet and tape
Scenes from Shir ha-Shirim (1975), soprano, two tenors, bass soli and chamber ensemble
String Quartet No. 3 (1976)
Pennplay (1979), sixteen players
Consorts (1980), symphonic band
String Quartet No. 4 (1980)
String Trio (1982), violin, viola, violoncello
Romancero (1983), soprano, flute (piccolo, alto flute), clarinet (bass clarinet), violin and violoncello
Divertimento (1984), cello and orchestra
Capriccio (1985), two pianos
Salvos (1986), flute (piccolo, alto flute), clarinet, harp, percussion, violin and cello
Quartetto (1987), flute, violin, viola and violoncello
Synchronisms No. 9 (1988), violin and tape
Biblical Songs (1990), soprano, flute, clarinet, violin, cello, and piano
Concertante (1990), string quartet and orchestra
Simple Dances (1991–2001), flute (piccolo, alto flute), two percussion, piano, and cello
Synchronisms No. 10 (1992), guitar and electronic sounds
Shulamit's Dream (1993), soprano and orchestra
Festino (1994), guitar, viola, violoncello, contrabass
Concertino (1995), violin and chamber orchestra
Flashbacks (1995), flute (piccolo and alto flute), clarinet (bass clarinet), violin violoncello, piano and percussion
Quartetto No. 2 (1996), oboe, violin, viola, violoncello
String Quartet No. 5 (1998)
Quartetto No. 3 (2000), piano, violin, viola, and violoncello
Cantione Sine Textu (2001), soprano and chamber ensemble
RecitAndy (2001), cello
Duo Capriccioso (2003), piano and violin
Sefarad: Four Spanish-Ladino Folkscenes (2004), baritone voice, flute (piccolo, alto flute), clarinet (bass clarinet), percussion, violin and cello
Quartetto No. 4 (2005), clarinet, violin, viola and cello
Synchronisms No. 11 (2005), contrabass and tape
Synchronisms No. 12 (2006), clarinet and tape
Piano Septet (2007)
Divertimento for 8 ‘Ambiguous Symmetries’ (2015), flute, clarinet, percussion, violin, viola, cello, bass, piano
String Quartet No. 6 ("Fragments")(2016)

Discography
Works by Martin Brody, Mario Davidovsky, Miriam Gideon, Rand Steiger, Chinary Ung, New World Records, New World 80412–2. Release date: December 8, 1992.
Synchronisms No. 6; Fred Bronstein, Piano.
Korf: Symphony No.2/Davidovsky: Divertimento/Wright: Night Scenes, New World Records, New World 80383–2. Release date: December 8, 1992.
Divertimento; Fred Sherry, cello; Riverside Symphony, George Rothman conducting.
Flashbacks: Music by Mario Davidovsky, Bridge Records, Bridge 9097. Release date: June 27, 2000.
Flashbacks; The New York New Music Ensemble.
Festino; Speculum Musicae.
Romancero; Susan Narucki, soprano; Speculum Musicae.
Quartetto No. 2; Peggy Pearson, oboe; Bayla Keyes, violin; Mary Ruth Ray, viola; Rhonda Rider, violoncello.
Synchronisms No. 10; David Starobin, guitar.
String Trio; Speculum Musicae.
Mario Davidovsky: 3 Cycles on Biblical Texts; Susan Narucki, soprano; Riverside Symphony, George Rothman conducting; Bridge Records, Bridge 1112. Release Date: July 30, 2002.
Shulamit's Dream.
Scenes from Shir ha-Shirim.
Biblical Songs.
Harvard Composers, Mendelssohn String Quartet, BIS Records, BIS-SACD-1264. Release date: September 9, 2003.
String Quartet No. 5.
Salvos: Chamber Music of Mario Davidovsky, Empyrean Ensemble; Susan Narucki, soprano. Arabesque Records, Arabesque Z6777. Release date: January 6, 2004.
Simple Dances.
Cantione Sine Textu.
Quartetto.
Salvos.
String Trio.
The Music of Mario Davidovsky, Vol. 3, Bridge Records, Bridge 9171. Release date: September 1, 2005.
Synchronisms No. 5; The Manhattan School of Music Percussion Ensemble, Jeffrey Milarsky, conductor.
Synchronisms No. 6 Aleck Karis, piano.
Synchronisms No. 9; Curtis Macomber, violin.
Chacona; Curtis Macomber, violin; Eric Bartlett, cello; Aleck Karis, piano.
Quartetto; Susan Palma Nidel, flute; Curtis Macomber, violin; Maureen Gallagher, viola; Eric Bartlett, violoncello.
Duo Capriccioso; Curtis Macomber, violin; Aleck Karis, piano.

Notable students

References

Further reading
Cole Gagne and Tracy Caras, Soundpieces: Interviews with American Composers, Metuchen, New Jersey: Scarecrow Press, 1982.
"Mario Davidovsky: An Introduction" by Eric Chasalow, AGNI 50 – via ericchasalow.com
"Music: Does it Have a Future?" by George Crumb, a slightly revised article, originally appearing in The Kenyon Review, Summer 1980.
Charles Wuorinen, "Mario Davidovsky: Contrastes No. 1", Perspectives of New Music, vol. 4, no. 2 (Spring–Summer 1966), 144–149.
Liner notes to discs Bridge 9097 and Bridge 9112 (see Discography)
, by Bob Gluck on September 24, 2005.

External links

"Electronic Study No. 3, In Memoriam Edgar Varèse", Columbia-Princeton Electronic Music Center, recording, from Aspen, no. 4, The McLuhan issue; via UbuWeb
Art of the States: Mario Davidovsky – RealAudio streams of three works by the composer
Performance on 2006-10-22 by Lynn Kuo of Synchronisms No. 9: , .
 (includes video)

1934 births
2019 deaths
American contemporary classical composers
American classical composers
Argentine classical composers
American male classical composers
Members of the American Academy of Arts and Letters
Pulitzer Prize for Music winners
Argentine Jews
Jewish Argentine musicians
Jewish classical musicians
Argentine people of Lithuanian-Jewish descent
Argentine emigrants to the United States
Harvard University faculty
Manhattan School of Music faculty
University of Michigan faculty
Pupils of Aaron Copland
Pupils of Milton Babbitt
People from Buenos Aires Province
20th-century Argentine artists
21st-century American composers
20th-century classical composers
21st-century classical composers
Mannes College The New School for Music faculty
20th-century American composers